The Flyweight competition at the 2015 AIBA World Boxing Championships was held from 7–15 October 2015. It was a qualifying tournament for the next year's 2016 Summer Olympics. Elvin Mamishzada of Azerbaijan defeated Yosbany Veitia of Cuba to win the world title.

Medalists

Seeds

  Yosbany Veitia 
  Elvin Mamishzada
  Mohamed Flissi 
  Daniel Asenov

Draw

Finals

Section 1

Section 2

Results

Ranking

References

External links
Official website

2015 AIBA World Boxing Championships